John "Jack" Lucas (born 8 April 1961) is a former Australian rules footballer who played with the Sydney Swans in the Victorian Football League (VFL).

Lucas, a New South Wales recruit originally from Ariah Park Mirrool, played league football with Sydney from 1982 to 1984, the club's first three seasons after relocation. He played 19 VFL games for Sydney, 12 of them in the 1983 season.

Following his VFL career, Lucas moved to Western Australia and joined Perth in the West Australian Football League, where he played 40 games.

He also spent a season in the ACT Football League with Queanbeyan in 1989 and won a premiership. Queanbeyan were coached by his uncle Brian Quade, brother of Ricky Quade.

Back in Perth, Lucas coached junior footballers, including his son Kane Lucas, who would go on to be drafted by Carlton.

References

External links

1961 births
Australian rules footballers from New South Wales
Sydney Swans players
Perth Football Club players
Queanbeyan Football Club players
Living people